Amazin' is the fifth studio album by American rapper Trina. It was released by Slip-N-Slide Records on May 4, 2010 in North America. It featured singles "That's My Attitude", "Million Dollar Girl", the R&B hit, "Always" and "White Girl".

Background and development 
Amazin''' features collaborations from Nicki Minaj, Keri Hilson, Diddy, Kalenna Harper of Diddy-Dirty Money,  Monica, Flo Rida, Lyfe Jennings and Shonie. In an interview with BET about her fifth studio album, Trina stated, 

The album's official cover art was revealed on March 26, 2010. The vocals of Lady Gaga, who also co-wrote "Let Dem Hoes Fight", were replaced by Kalenna of Dirty Money, due to issues with Gaga's record label.

 Commercial Performance 
The album debuted at number thirteen on the US Billboard 200, number two on the Billboard Top Rap Albums, number one on Independent Albums, and number four on Billboard Top R&B/Hip Hop Albums. It sold more than 32,000 copies in its first week. As of May 2011, the album has sold 300,000 copies in the United States.

Reception

An album preview was held on February 19 where critics were able to preview 10 of the 15 tracks to make the album. Many critics complimented on the album's preview stating "Amazin' is catered for the dance floor – something that Trina stated she wanted to hear when she’s getting her sip on at the club. Though we only heard a few minutes of each track, it’s a lot less explicit than usual fare – a sign that Trina might be growing up."

 Release and promotion 
The album was first revealed on Trina's official Myspace page. Along with singles being released for promotion, Trina released two mixtapes to commemorate her fifth LP. One is named after the album, Amazin' (The Mixtape), and the other after the first lead single, Definition Of A Million Dollar Girl.

 Singles 
 "That's My Attitude" was released as the lead single from the album on August 21, 2009. A music video was released for the song on January 7, 2010. Over seas the song peaked at number seventeen in Denmark.
 "Million Dollar Girl", which features Diddy and Keri Hilson, was released as the second single from the album on January 12, 2010. The music video was released on March 15, 2010. The single charted on the US Hot R&B/Hip-Hop Singles at number 61,Hot 100 airplay chart at 98 and number 19 on Rap Songs,peaked at thirty-two on the Bulgaria top 40 chart.The song also peaked at number ten in Denmark.
 "Always" featuring Monica, the album's second single, peaked at number 42 on the US Hot R&B/Hip-Hop Singles. Despite being the most successful single from the album, no music video has been released.
 "White Girl" featuring Flo Rida & Git Fresh was released as the third single from the album on June 29, 2010. The video was filmed on June 7, 2010 and was released on July 27, 2010.
 "My Bitches" was released as a buzz single on August 3, 2010, but it has failed to chart. Its video was released in August 2010, after being filmed in June 2010.

 Unreleased singles 
 "Let Dem Hoes Fight" featuring Kalenna, was intended to be the lead single but was never released. A demo was leaked before  "Million Dollar Girl" and featured Lady Gaga who co-wrote the song and was meant to be featured as well but there were complications with Gaga's record label. Kalenna was featured instead but was not an official single.
 "I Want It All" featuring Monica was also meant to be released as a follow up to "Always" but fell through. Trina confirmed a video was shot but has yet to surface.

 Track listing 
The official track listing was revealed on April 12 at an album pre-order site.

 Personnel 
Credits for Amazin'' adapted from Allmusic.

Musa "Milk" Adeoye - A&R
Natario King Johnson (Songwriter)
Wayne Allison - Mixing
Chris Athens - Mastering
Bigg D - Producer
The Blackout Movement - Producer
Julian "Ju-Boy" Boothe - A&R
Leslie Brathwaite - Mixing
Josh "Redd" Burke - Executive Producer
Henry "Hollywood Henry" Cedeno - Marketing, Product Manager
Don Corell - Producer
Cozmo - Producer
CP Hollywood - Producer
Sheika Daley - Make-Up
DJ Frank E - Producer
OhZee - Producer
Karen "KD" Douglas - Creative Supervision
DVS - Mixing
Roger Erickson - Photography
Ira Folston - Engineer
Jamee Gidwitz - Stylist
Jim Jonsin - Producer

J.U.S.T.I.C.E. League - Producer
KParn - Producer
LambL - Producer
Yasiel "Edge" Landrian - Engineer
Marilyn Lopez - Publicity
Ted "Touche" Lucas - Composer, Executive Producer
Kisha Madrid - Publicity
Angela Meadows - Hair Stylist
Charles Moniz - Engineer
Lili Picou - Art Direction
Reginald Saunders - Composer, Creative Supervision
Schife - Producer
Ray Seay - Mixing
Shonie - Vocals
Maxwell Smart - Producer
Travis "KParn" Spivey - Keyboards
Katrina "Trina" Taylor - Executive Producer
Mathew Testa - Engineer
Wouri Vice - Stylist
Jason Wilkie - Assistant
Young Yonny - Producer

Charts

Weekly charts

Year-end charts

References 

2010 albums
Trina albums
EMI Records albums
Albums produced by Cozmo
Albums produced by Jim Jonsin
Albums produced by J.U.S.T.I.C.E. League
Albums produced by J. R. Rotem
Albums produced by Maxwell Smart (record producer)